Ross Paul Brewer (born 1 October 1979) is a male former British gymnast. He is a double gold medal winner at the Commonwealth Games.

Gymnastics career
Brewer represented England and won a gold medal in the team event, at the 1998 Commonwealth Games in Kuala Lumpur, Malaysia. Four years later he repeated the success of winning team gold at the 2002 Commonwealth Games in Manchester and won a bronze medal at his third Commonwealth Games in 2006 at Melbourne.

References

References 
 

1979 births
Living people
British male artistic gymnasts
Gymnasts at the 1998 Commonwealth Games
Gymnasts at the 2002 Commonwealth Games
Gymnasts at the 2006 Commonwealth Games
Commonwealth Games gold medallists for England
Commonwealth Games bronze medallists for England
Commonwealth Games medallists in gymnastics
Medallists at the 1998 Commonwealth Games
Medallists at the 2002 Commonwealth Games
Medallists at the 2006 Commonwealth Games